Choudrant is a village in Lincoln Parish, Louisiana, United States. The population was 845 at the 2010 census. It is part of the Ruston Micropolitan Statistical Area.

Geography

Demographics

2020 census

As of the 2020 United States census, there were 989 people, 382 households, and 293 families residing in the village.

2000 census
As of the census of 2000, there were 582 people, 234 households, and 167 families residing in the village. The racial makeup of the village was 91.92% White, 6.53% African American, 0.17% Native American, 1.03% from other races, and 0.34% from two or more races. Hispanic or Latino of any race were 1.20% of the population.

There were 234 households, out of which 35.5% had children under the age of 18 living with them, 56.4% were married couples living together, 11.5% had a female householder with no husband present, and 28.6% were non-families. 24.8% of all households were made up of individuals, and 8.1% had someone living alone who was 65 years of age or older. The average household size was 2.49 and the average family size was 2.98.

In the village, the population was spread out, with 25.1% under the age of 18, 10.0% from 18 to 24, 32.3% from 25 to 44, 19.8% from 45 to 64, and 12.9% who were 65 years of age or older. The median age was 35 years. For every 100 females, there were 99.3 males. For every 100 females age 18 and over, there were 99.1 males.

The median income for a household in the village was $37,321, and the median income for a family was $42,656. Males had a median income of $30,855 versus $25,000 for females. The per capita income for the village was $15,726. About 4.0% of families and 6.6% of the population were below the poverty line, including 6.5% of those under the age of 18 and 10.0% of those 65 and older.

Economy
As a village, Choudrant has limited business opportunity. There are several "home grown" businesses within the village limits. Some of the more notable are Parnell's Station, Choudrant Mini Mart, and Choudrant Appliance. The most prominent of local businesses is Origin Bank, founded as the Bank of Choudrant. It has since grown to become one of the largest banks in both Lincoln Parish and the neighboring Ouachita Parish. Despite its growth though, the FDIC still recognizes the original Choudrant branch as its home office. Origin Bank also sponsored the Louisiana Peach Festival in Ruston until 2005, whence sponsorship was taken up by Squire Creek Country Club.

A Pilgrim's Pride poultry hatchery in Choudrant was marked for closure early in 2009, along with other company operations in nearby Arcadia in Bienville Parish, Athens in Claiborne Parish, and Farmerville in Union Parish. The closures cost this part of North Louisiana some 1,300 jobs. Several weeks later, however, Pilgrim's Pride accepted an $80 million offer from Foster Farms of California to purchase the operations. In addition, to the 1,300 direct jobs in Farmerville, the purchase spares the small farms of some three hundred independent growers. Foster Farms put up $40 million and the State of Louisiana a matching $40 million. Foster Farms will further invest $10 million in capital improvements at the Farmerville plant, to be matched by the state, in an agreement announced by Governor Bobby Jindal.

Government
Choudrant is served by four elected officials—a mayor and three village aldermen. Other public employees include a town clerk and a small police force. For many years, Choudrant was served by only one law enforcement officer, its police chief, but the force has grown in recent years adding additional officers and a canine unit. The Lincoln Parish Sheriff's Office also provides law enforcement services as needed.

Fire protection in the Village is provided by the Choudrant Volunteer Fire Department.

Education

Choudrant is located within the fifth district of the Lincoln Parish School System. There are two schools within the Choudrant district—Choudrant Elementary and Choudrant High. The elementary school services between 400 and 450 students in grades K-6 while the high school contains approximately 350 students in grade levels 7-12. Both schools are well known as having high academic achievement under the state's school improvement plan and No Child Left Behind. The high school was rebuilt in 1937 after a fire and has had no substantive renovations or updates since that time. Choudrant Elementary was similarly rebuilt and expanded after a fire in the 1970s, but the student population had outgrown its walls. However, attempts to renovate the high school and rebuild the elementary school were halted in 2007 when citizens of the school district voted by a 2-1 majority against passage of a bond issue to fund such changes. The Tax later passed a couple years later. Since then the high school has been rebuilt and added an entire new wing, a new ag center and a new track.

Notable people
Bill Bagwell, baseball player
Sam Burns, Professional Golfer

References

External links
Village of Choudrant
Choudrant Fire Department

Villages in Lincoln Parish, Louisiana
Villages in Louisiana
Villages in Ruston, Louisiana micropolitan area